New Richland is an unincorporated community in Logan County, in the U.S. state of Ohio.

History
New Richland was originally called Richland, and under the latter name was laid out in 1832. A post office called New Richland was established in 1846, and remained in operation until 1926.

References

Unincorporated communities in Logan County, Ohio
1832 establishments in Ohio
Populated places established in 1832
Unincorporated communities in Ohio